Jennie Linden (born 8 December 1939) is an English actress. She is best known for her starring role in Ken Russell's film Women in Love (1969) as well as her starring role in the cult film Nightmare (1964).

Life and career
Linden was born in Worthing to Marcus and Freida Fletcher.

Her earliest film appearances were as the heroine in Hammer's Nightmare (1964) and Barbara in Dr. Who and the Daleks (1965). Her most widely known film role was as Ursula in Women in Love (1969), for which she received a BAFTA nomination; a year later she appeared in the film version of Iris Murdoch's novel A Severed Head. Her subsequent film appearances include Vampira (1974), Valentino (1977) and Charlie Muffin (1979).

Wishing to raise her son in England, Linden decided not to pursue a career in Hollywood. She was considered for The Lion in Winter (1968) and The Go-Between (1970); the latter was for the lead role of Lady Marian Trimingham, for which Julie Christie was later cast. She turned down the role of Amy in Sam Peckinpah's Straw Dogs (1971).

She starred with Kenneth Williams in the theatrical production of My Fat Friend in 1972. Also, she toured in Trevor Nunn's Royal Shakespeare Company production of Hedda Gabler for two years playing Thea Elvsted, with Glenda Jackson in the title role; they later appeared together in the 1975 film adaptation.

Linden's television credits include The Avengers (episode: Lobster Quadrille, 1964); Dr Finlay's Casebook (episode: A Right to Live, 1965); Sherlock Holmes (1965); The Saint (1966); The Persuaders! (episode: To the Death, Baby, 1970); The Rivals (1970); The Adventures of Black Beauty (episode: "Foul Play", 1973); Thriller (episode: "Death to Sister Mary", 1974) as "Sister Mary"; Little Lord Fauntleroy (1976); Lillie (1978) as Patsy Cornwallis-West; Tales of the Unexpected (episode: "Pattern of Guilt", 1982); Lytton's Diary (1985); Chancer (1990); Lovejoy (1991); and Trainer (1991). She continues to perform different roles on TV and stage. She is married to Chris Mann; they have a son, Rupert.

Partial filmography

Nightmare (1964) as Janet
Dr. Who and the Daleks (1965) as Barbara
Women in Love (1969) as Ursula Brangwen
A Severed Head (1970) as Georgie Hands
Pogled iz potkrovlija (1974) as Linda Channing
Vampira (1974) as Angela
Hedda (1975) as Thea Elvsted
Valentino (1977) as Agnes Ayres
Charlie Muffin (1979) as Edith

References

External links 
 
 

1939 births
20th-century English actresses
21st-century English actresses
Actresses from Sussex
Alumni of the Royal Central School of Speech and Drama
English film actresses
English stage actresses
English television actresses
Living people
People from Worthing
People educated at the Elmhurst School for Dance